The Town of Brisbane colonial by-election, 1869 was a by-election held on 10 February 1869 in the electoral district of Town of Brisbane for the Queensland Legislative Assembly.

History
On 30 January 1869, Theophilus Parsons Pugh, member for Town of Brisbane, resigned. George Edmondstone was elected unopposed at the resulting by-election on 10 February 1869.

See also
 Members of the Queensland Legislative Assembly, 1868–1870

References

1869 elections in Australia
Queensland state by-elections
19th century in Brisbane